North Springfield is a census-designated place (CDP) in Fairfax County, Virginia, United States. The population was 7,274 at the 2010 census.

Geography
North Springfield is located in southern Fairfax County at  (38.803813, −77.208213). Its borders are the Capital Beltway and Norfolk Southern Railway to the south, Flag Run and the Capital Beltway to the west, Braddock Road to the north, and Backlick Run and Backlick Road to the east. Neighboring communities are Springfield to the east and south, Kings Park and Ravensworth to the west, Wakefield to the northwest, and Annandale to the north. The Capital Beltway (Interstate 495) is accessible from Exit 54 (Braddock Road) at the northwest corner of the CDP.

Demographics
As of the census of 2000, there were 9,173 people, 3,251 households, and 2,470 families residing in the CDP. The racial makeup of the CDP was 71.99% White, 3.65% African American, 0.17% Native American, 16.13% Asian, 0.21% Pacific Islander, 4.63% from other races, and 3.21% from two or more races. Hispanic or Latino of any race were 10.50% of the population.

There were 3,251 households, out of which 34.8% had children under the age of 18 living with them, 64.9% were married couples living together, 7.6% had a female householder with no husband present, and 24.0% were non-families. 17.8% of all households were made up of individuals, and 6.8% had someone living alone who was 65 years of age or older. The average household size was 2.82 and the average family size was 3.19.

In the CDP, the population was spread out, with 24.1% under the age of 18, 6.2% from 18 to 24, 32.8% from 25 to 44, 23.8% from 45 to 64, and 13.1% who were 65 years of age or older. The median age was 38 years. For every 100 females, there were 100.9 males. For every 100 females age 18 and over, there were 99.1 males.

The median income for a household in the CDP was $73,062, and the median income for a family was $80,212. Males had a median income of $49,590 versus $37,938 for females. The per capita income for the CDP was $28,592. About 0.9% of families and 2.5% of the population were below the poverty line, including 1.3% of those under age 18 and 1.0% of those age 65 or over.

Education
Fairfax County Public Schools operates public schools in the area.

North Springfield Elementary School is in the North Springfield CDP and has a Springfield postal address.

Ravensworth Elementary School, which has a Springfield postal address, was defined as being in the North Springfield CDP as per the 1990 U.S. Census and the 2000 U.S. Census, but in the 2010 U.S. Census it was defined as being in Ravensworth CDP.

References

Springfield, Virginia
Census-designated places in Virginia
Washington metropolitan area
Census-designated places in Fairfax County, Virginia